Walter Miller was the middleweight wrestling champion in 1919.

Biography
He was born in Poland and contracted rheumatic fever as a child.

Championships and accomplishments
Professional wrestling
World Lightweight Championship (Europa-Version) (1 time)
World Middleweight Championship (2 times)
World Welterweight Championship (2 times)
World Lightweight Championship (1 time)
Wisconsin Heavyweight Championship (1 time)

External links

References

Australian male sport wrestlers
American male sport wrestlers
Polish male sport wrestlers
Australian male professional wrestlers
American male professional wrestlers
Polish professional wrestlers
Year of birth missing
Year of death missing